Laurent Hervé (born 19 June 1976 in Pont-l'Abbé, France) is a French former professional football midfielder who is manager of AS Vitré. He was previously manager at Vannes, where he ended his playing career.

Honours
Vannes
 Coupe de la Ligue: runner-up 2008–09

References

External links
 
 

1976 births
Living people
People from Pont-l'Abbé
Sportspeople from Finistère
Association football midfielders
French footballers
En Avant Guingamp players
AS Beauvais Oise players
Milton Keynes Dons F.C. players
Vannes OC players
Ligue 1 players
Ligue 2 players
English Football League players
Footballers from Brittany
French football managers
Vannes OC managers
Brittany international footballers